Àbùlà is a soup of Yoruba people from Western Nigeria. It is typically eaten together with Amala, but can be eaten with other swallow foods. Abula is literally means a mixture of soups, but it is mostly associated to gbegiri (Bean soup), Ewedu (draw vegetable soup) and ọbẹ̀ ata (stew).

Abula is considered a delicacy because it is not a common meal. It takes a considerable time and effort to make. Although the meal is majorly eaten among the Yorùbá people of western Nigeria, it is more common among the people of Ọ̀yọ́ and Ogbómòṣọ́

See also
 List of soups

References

African soups
Nigerian cuisine
Igbo cuisine
Yoruba cuisine